James Crawford (4 March 1870 – 28 December 1916) was a barrister and member of the Queensland Legislative Assembly.

Biography
Crawford was born in Woonona, New South Wales, to parents James Crawford and his wife Ellen (née Simpson) and attended school while still in  Woonona. He was a coalminer in Wollongong in 1883 and by 1888 he was in Narrandera working for the railways. He became a barrister and solicitor working out of Clermont.

When working in the mines he became involved in the labour movement, becoming vice-president of the Australian Workers' Association in Cobar, New South Wales, and secretary of the Fitzroy Miners' Union. He was a member of the Royal Commission into the Mount Morgan disaster in 1908.

In 1905 he married Myra Clarke but it is not recorded if they had any children. He drowned in the catastrophic floods that hit Clermont in December 1916.

Political career
Crawford represented the state seat of Fitzroy from 1909 until 1912. He then represented the new seat of Mount Morgan in 1912 but was defeated by James Stopford in 1915. He started out representing the Labour Party but by the end of his political career he was a member of the Ministerialists.

References

Members of the Queensland Legislative Assembly
1870 births
1916 deaths
Deaths in floods
Natural disaster deaths in Australia
Accidental deaths in Queensland